The men's 200 metre backstroke event at the 1992 Summer Olympics took place on 28 July at the Piscines Bernat Picornell in Barcelona, Spain. There were 44 competitors from 34 nations. Each nation had been limited to two swimmers in the event since 1984. The event was won by Martín López-Zubero of Spain. Vladimir Selkov of the Unified Team took silver, while Stefano Battistelli of Italy earned bronze. It was the first medal in the men's 200 metre backstroke for each nation (though the Soviet Union, from the former republics of which the Unified Team was formed, had taken gold in 1988).

Background

This was the ninth appearance of the 200 metre backstroke event. It was first held in 1900. The event did not return until 1964; since then, it has been on the programme at every Summer Games. From 1904 to 1960, a men's 100 metre backstroke was held instead. In 1964, only the 200 metres was held. Beginning in 1968 and ever since, both the 100 and 200 metre versions have been held.

Two of the 8 finalists from the 1988 Games returned: fifth-place finisher Dirk Richter of East Germany (now competing for Germany) and eighth-place finisher Rogério Romero of Brazil. The medalists at the 1991 World Aquatics Championships had been Martín López-Zubero of Spain, Stefano Battistelli of Italy, and Vladimir Selkov of the Soviet Union. All three competed in Barcelona (with Selkov now representing the Unified Team). López-Zubero was also the world record holder, having broken it twice in 1991. He was the favourite in the event, with European championships in both 100 metres and 200 metres in 1991 to go along with his World title and world record.

Colombia, Estonia, Fiji, Israel, Kuwait, Norway, Paraguay, and Turkey each made their debut in the event; some former Soviet republics competed as the Unified Team. Australia and Great Britain each made their eighth appearance, tied for most among nations to that point.

Competition format

The competition used a two-round (heats and final) format. The advancement rule followed the format introduced in 1952. A swimmer's place in the heat was not used to determine advancement; instead, the fastest times from across all heats in a round were used. A "consolation final" had been added in 1984. There were 6 heats of up to 8 swimmers each. The top 8 swimmers advanced to the final. The next 8 (9th through 16th) competed in a consolation final. Swim-offs were used as necessary to break ties.

This swimming event used backstroke. Because an Olympic-size swimming pool is 50 metres long, this race consisted of four lengths of the pool.

Records

Prior to this competition, the existing world and Olympic records were as follows.

The following records were established during the competition:

Schedule

All times are Central European Summer Time (UTC+2)

Results

Heats

The eight fastest swimmers advanced to final A, while the next eight went to final B.

Finals

The finals were held on the evening of 28 July.

Final B

Final A

Selkov went out first and led for most of the first three lengths. Itoi took the lead at the third turn. López-Zubero and Battistelli finished strong, with the former taking the lead with 25 metres to go; the latter caught Itoi but not Selkov.

References

External links
 Official Report

Swimming at the 1992 Summer Olympics
200 metre backstroke at the Olympics
Men's events at the 1992 Summer Olympics